Don't Quit may refer to:
Don't Quit (poem), a poem by Edgar A. Guest
"Don't Quit" (song), a song by DJ Khaled and Calvin Harris